Aubrey Bruce Cooper Cecil (10 March 1847 – 26 August 1918) was an English cricketer. Cecil was a right-handed batsman.

Cecil represented Hampshire in single first-class match in 1876 against Derbyshire, scoring six runs.

Cecil died at South Brisbane, Queensland, Australia on 26 August 1918.

Family
Cecil's brother Egerton Cecil also represented Hampshire in a single first-class match in 1875.

External links
Aubrey Cecil at Cricinfo
Aubrey Cecil at CricketArchive

1847 births
1918 deaths
Cricketers from Bedfordshire
English cricketers
Hampshire cricketers
People from Toddington, Bedfordshire